Dirk Braeckman (born 1958 in Eeklo, Belgium) is a Belgian photographer who lives and works in Ghent, Belgium. The artist studied photography and film at the Royal Academy of Fine Arts in Ghent from 1977 until 1981.

Photography career
Dirk Braeckman has had numerous group exhibitions and several solo shows in Europe, including ones at Ghent's SMAK (2001)and the De Pont Foundation in Tilburg (2004). He has received considerable acclaim for his portraits of the Belgian king Albert II and Queen Paola, photographs commissioned by the Royal Palace of Brussels.

In addition to his photographic body of work, Braeckman creates site specific installations, for varying projects such as Beaufort in Ostend or Watou's art and poetry festival. Recently a permanent installation of a monumental photowork (of which a facsimile is now presented at Robert Miller's Gallery) has been inaugurated at the new .

In 2002 Braeckman was granted the cultural award of the University of Louvain and received the Cultural Prize of the Flemish Community, Section Fine Arts in 2005. Braeckman's images have appeared in numerous magazines, books and catalogues. Most recently in the  Photo Art book, published by Dumont, Thames & Hudson and Aperture. in 2017 Braeckman represented Belgium at the Venice Biennale.

Publications
Braeckman has published two artist's books, z.Z(t). I  and z.Z(t) II. The abbreviation in the title stands for the German expression zur Zeit, which means "for now", "at this very moment". On his commission for the Belgian Royal Palace he published the book Chiaroscuro.

Bibliography 
 Dirk Braeckman, Dirk Braeckman, Roma Publications, Amsterdam 2011,

References

External links
 
 Zeno X Gallery - Dirk Braeckman images, biography and cv

1958 births
Living people
Belgian photographers
Belgian contemporary artists